Kainz is an Austrian and German surname. Notable people with the surname include:

 Florian Kainz (born 1992), Austrian football midfielder
 Howard P. Kainz (born 1933), American professor emeritus
 Tobias Kainz (born 1992), Austrian footballer
 Adolf Kainz (1903–1948), Austrian canoeist
 Josef Kainz (1858–1910), Austrian actor
 Wolfgang Kainz (born 1967), Austrian scientist